Hubert Auer may refer to:

 Hubert Auer (card game historian) (born  1950), Austrian card game historian
 Hubert Auer (footballer) (born 1981), Austrian footballer